Ece Ayhan Çağlar (September 10, 1931 in Muğla – July 13, 2002 in İzmir) was a contemporary Turkish poet. He used the name Ece Ayhan in his poems. He is one of the prominent figures of the II. New Movement, yet he preferred to refer to this movement as Civilian Poetry. His book Blind Cat Black and Orthodoxies features examples of homoerotic poetry in Modern Turkish literature.

Selected works
 Kınar Hanım'ın Denizleri (1959) (Seas of Kinar Hanim)
 Bakışsız Bir Kedi Kara (1965) (A Blind Cat Black)
 Ortodokslular (1968) (Orthodoxies)
 Devlet ve Tabiat (1973)(Government and Nature)
 Yort Savul (Collection of the above works, 1977)
 Zambaklı Padişah (1981) (The Sultan's Lily)
 Defterler (Diaries, 1981) (Notebooks)
 Çok Eski Adıyladır (1982) (With Its Very Old Name)
 Kolsuz bir Hattat (Prose, 1987) (An Armless Calligrapher)
 Çanakkaleli Melahat'a İki El Mektup ya da Özel Bir Fuhuş Tarihi (1991) (Two Rounds Of Letter To Melahat Of Çanakkale or A Special History Of Prostitution)
 Sivil Şiirler (1993) (Civil Poems)
 Son Şiirler (1993) (Last Poems)
 Bütün Yort Savul'lar'' (Complete poetry, 1994)

See also
 List of contemporary Turkish poets

References
 
Ahmet Soysal: "A'dan Z'ye Ece Ayhan" (Supplement of Kitaplık review,Istanbul: 2003)
Ahmet Soysal: "Eşsiz Olana Yakınlık" (Kanat ed., 2006, Istanbul)

References

External links
 Detailed biography and complete works
 Poems "Master's Work", "Monument Of The Unknown Student", "Phaeton" and "Violet Rascal"
 Poems "Ocharina" and "Rats of Jerusalem"
 Poem "Sword"
 Poem "Violet Rascal"

1931 births
2002 deaths
Ankara University Faculty of Political Sciences alumni
Turkish LGBT poets
Gay poets
Turkish gay writers
20th-century Turkish poets
Turkish male poets
20th-century Turkish male writers
20th-century Turkish LGBT people